Chandu is a 1958 film directed by Majnu. It stars Mehmood, Om Prakash, Pran Krishan Sikand, Shashikala Om Prakash Saigal and Gope. The film's music was composed by Bipin Babul and the lyrics were by Raja Mehdi Ali Khan, Kaifi Azmi and Raj Baldev Raj.

Plot

Cast

 Mehmood Ali
 Om Prakash
 Pran Krishan Sikand
 Shashikala Om Prakash Saigal
 Gope
 Sunder
 Satish Batra
 Khwar Jama
 Meena Shorey
 Majnu
 Gulab
 Haroon
 Daljeet

Soundtrack

References

External links
 
 Chandu at the Bollywood Movie Database

1958 films
1950s Hindi-language films